Cychrus angustior is a species of ground beetle in the subfamily of Carabinae. It was described by Kleinfeld in 2000.

References

angustior
Beetles described in 2000